Isotomiella minor is a species of elongate-bodied springtail in the family Isotomidae. It is found in Europe.

References

External links

 

Entomobryomorpha
Articles created by Qbugbot
Animals described in 1896